Tublay, officially the Municipality of Tublay, is a 5th class municipality in the province of Benguet, Philippines. According to the 2020 census, it has a population of 19,429 people.

History

Tublay began as a township organized by the American government in November 1900. Magastino Laruan is appointed as the first town president (mayor) of Tublay. He is a part of the Cariño Family in Benguet.

Geography
Tublay is at the central portion of Benguet. It is bounded by Kapangan on the north, Atok on the east, Itogon and Bokod on the southeast, La Trinidad on the west, and Sablan on the northwest.

According to the Philippine Statistics Authority, the municipality has a land area of  constituting  of the  total area of Benguet.

There are 2 seasons for Tublay, Benguet will be wet season from May to October and dry season from November to April.

Barangays
Tublay is politically subdivided into 8 barangays. Ambassador is the largest barangay in terms of land area (11.52 km2), while Tuel is the smallest (4.79 km2). These barangays are headed by elected officials: Barangay Captain, Barangay Council, whose members are called Barangay Councilors. All are elected every three years.

Climate

Demographics

In the 2020 census, Tublay had a population of 19,429.

Economy

Government
Tublay, belonging to the lone congressional district of the province of Benguet, is governed by a mayor designated as its local chief executive and by a municipal council as its legislative body in accordance with the Local Government Code. The mayor, vice mayor, and the councilors are elected directly by the people through an election which is being held every three years.

Elected officials

Education

Public schools
As of 2014, Tublay has 19 public elementary schools and 2 public secondary schools.

Notes

References

External links
 [ Philippine Standard Geographic Code]

Municipalities of Benguet
Populated places established in 1900